The railway from Grenoble to Montmélian is a  long railway in southeastern France. It was built by the PLM and opened on 15 September 1864 (as a double track) to provide a link between Grenoble and Montmélian. In September 1991 it was electrified between Grenoble and Gières and electrification of the whole line was realised and in service by 15 December 2013.

History 
In the past, the line took a route more north, closer to the centre of Grenoble. However, as part of the city's preparations for the 1968 Winter Olympics, the route was moved south, next to the Rocade Sud. A station was opened at Eybens and was used to serve the nearby Olympic Village. So as not to have the laborious task of changing all the milestones along the route, this new section was given distances as if it were part of the Ligne de Lyon - Grenoble, all the while staying part of this line.

In an effort to make the line more profitable, the stations St Hélène du Lac, Le-Cheylas-la-Bussière, Tencin-Theys, Lancey and  Domène were all closed to passenger traffic during the 1990s. Domène station stayed open in order to man the nearby factory slidings although trains do not stop. There is also a bus service between Goncelin and Le-Cheylas-la-Bussière. Lancey was reopened in 2005, something very exceptional in France. For this, the station was completely refurbished.

See also 
TER Auvergne-Rhône-Alpes
List of SNCF stations in Auvergne-Rhône-Alpes
SNCF
RFF

References

External links 
 External Link — basic, open stations
 Rail 21 — map, all stations, facts
 railsavoie.org — only Pontcharra → Montmélian

Railway lines in Auvergne-Rhône-Alpes
Standard gauge railways in France
Railway lines opened in 1864